Fritz Zuber-Buhler (1822 – November 23, 1896) was a Swiss painter in the style of Academic Classicism, born at Le Locle in Switzerland.

Biography
At sixteen years of age he moved to Paris, France where found his first teacher, Louis Grosclaude. Later he studied at the École des Beaux-Arts and then refined his technical skills with François-Édouard Picot, who followed the same lineage of contemporaneous artists such as Léon Perrault, Bouguereau, and Alexandre Cabanel. Afterwards he spent some time in Italy searching for inspiration; he may have also studied in Berlin. After five years abroad, he returned to Paris, where he made his debut at the Salon in 1850. In subsequent Salons he showed works in many media:  oil paintings, drawings, pastels and watercolors.

His painting Innocence shows his romantic view of the peasant children and their environment. He painted mythological and  religious subjects, as well as commissioned portraits. Zuber-Buhler  exhibited in the United States at the Pennsylvania Academy of the Fine Arts and achieved considerable success. He exhibited at the Salon (Paris) until 1891, by which time the European academic tradition he represented was past its heyday.

Works

Gallery

References

External links 
Zuber-Buhler's Cats

1822 births
1896 deaths
19th-century Swiss painters
Swiss male painters
19th-century Swiss male artists